Rouxel may refer to:

 Rouxel (car), a French automobile manufactured from 1899 until 1900
 Gustave Augustin Rouxel (1840-1908), French-born Catholic bishop in the United States
 Jacques Rouxel (1931–2004), French animator, best known for a TV series Les Shadoks
 Philibert Francois Rouxel de Blanchelande, (aka Philippe François Rouxel) viscount de Blanchelande (1735–1793), the French Governor of Saint-Domingue at the rise of the Haitian Revolution
 Jacques Eléonor Rouxel de Grancey (1655–1725), Marshal of France